Czechoslovakia, formally the Czech and Slovak Federative Republic, competed at the 1992 Winter Olympics in Albertville, France.
The team consisted of 74 athletes, which was the largest number at that time. It was the last time Czechoslovakia participated in the Winter Olympics, because the state split to Czech Republic and Slovakia and both countries entered their independent teams to the 1994 Winter Olympics.

Cross-country skier Pavel Benc was the flag-bearer of the country in the opening ceremony.

Medalists

Competitors
The following is the list of number of competitors in the Games.

Alpine skiing

Czechoslovakia's participation in the alpine skiing races was done by four skiers, all Slovaks. Lucia Medzihradská was the most successful of them reaching top eight in the women's combined event.

Men

Men's combined

Women

Women's combined

Biathlon

Jiřina Adamičková was close to winning a medal in the women's sprint, fighting for it after last shooting, but fading fast in the closing uphill section and falling down to fifth place, seven seconds behind bronze-medal Belova of the Unified Team.

Men

Women

Bobsleigh

After many years, Czechoslovakia entered its Olympic bobsleigh teams again, which recorded average to below-average results, but improved fast to be strong competitors at the 1994 Winter Olympics.

Cross-country skiing

The men's 50-kilometer freestyle marathon was the highlight of Czechoslovakia's men. Radim Nyč and Pavel Benc finished in top eight. Václav Korunka missed the top ten, but recorded three top-20 performances. In women's races Alžběta Havrančíková performed great in the second, freestyle-pursuit part of the combination race to move up from 34th to 17th place. Young Kateřina Neumannová took part in her first Olympics. The strong Czech and Slovak team-up of the women's relay fought for medals before losing pace in the last stage run by Iveta Zelingerová.

Men

Women

Figure skating

Reigning European Champion Petr Barna won his only Olympic medal behind Ukraine's Viktor Petrenko and United States' Paul Wylie. During his free program, Barna was the first skater to land the quadruple jump in the Olympic competition. The program was choreographed on the Hamlet soundtrack and was Barna's artistic masterpiece.

Radka Kovaříková and René Novotný teamed up after Novotný's 1988 Winter Olympics medicine problem. They beat Shishkova and Naumov of the Unified Team in the competition, but lost to Isabelle Brasseur and Lloyd Eisler of Canada in a close battle for the bronze medal, feeling a sort of injustice.

Kateřina Mrázová and Martin Šimeček finished 10th in the ice-dancing competition, while Lenka Kulovaná finished 11th. She was fifth in the 1992 European Championships, but lost to two European opponents only in Albertville.

Ice hockey

In 1991, Czechoslovakia failed to win a medal at the World Championships in Finland. Stanislav Neveselý and Josef Horešovský were sacked and the team was coached by Ivan Hlinka in Albertville. He named ten members of the 1991 World Championships for their Olympic squad. The team entered the group hammering Norway and coming back from 0-2 against France. Robert Lang's two goals helped beat Unified Team, which was the only one loss of the later Olympic champions. Czechoslovakia itself then recorded its first loss against Canada, but confirmed their quarterfinals participation with a win over Switzerland.

Sweden, the reigning World Champions, met Czechoslovakia in the quarterfinals, but was beaten as Kadlec, Janecký and Augusta scored their goals and Czechoslovakia headed to the semifinals against Canada again. The game was more balanced than the group one, but was lost 2-4. The team however had not problems finding motivation to beat United States for the bronze medal. Robert Lang was the top scoring player of the team (13 points).

Team roster
 Goalkeepers: Petr Bříza, Oldřich Svoboda, Jaromír Dragan
 Defenders: Leo Gudas, Miloslav Hořava, Drahomír Kadlec, Bedřich Ščerban, Richard Šmehlík, František Procházka, Róbert Švehla, Jiří Šlégr
 Forwards: Petr Rosol, Robert Lang, Kamil Kašťák, Richard Žemlička, Ladislav Lubina, Radek Ťoupal, Peter Veselovský, Petr Hrbek, Otakar Janecký, Patrik Augusta, Tomáš Jelínek, Igor Liba
 Coaches: Ivan Hlinka, Jaroslav Walter

February 8

February 10

February 12

February 14

February 16

Medal Round
Quarter-finals

Semi-finals

Bronze Medal Game

Luge

Petr Urban was the leading and most controversial member of the Czechoslovakia's luge team. He recorded two top-20 finishes, but was soon excluded from the team because of his cartoon jokes he published in daily Sport while competing in Albertville.

Nordic combined

Ski jumping

Jiří Parma was Czechoslovakia's flag-bearer at the 1988 Winter Olympics, but recorded his best ever Olympic results in 1992. He led the team in a dramatic competition, where only Czechoslovakia managed to get closer to the uncontested duo of Austria and gold medal winning Finland. He added large hill fifth place and normal hill 10th place.

Speed skating

Only two Czechoslovakia's speed skaters took part in the Games, but none of them was able to fight the competition for better than low-place finishes.

Men

References 

 Official Olympic Reports
 International Olympic Committee results database

Nations at the 1992 Winter Olympics
1992
Winter Olympics